Antonella Della Porta (August 18, 1927 Reggio Calabria, Italy – July 16, 2002 Rome, Italy) was an Italian actress.

She was an Italian actress active in cinema and television in the early sixties and the second half of the seventies.

Filmography

Cinema 

 Difendo il mio amore (1957)
 Two Women (1960)
 Ghosts of Rome (1961)
 The Witch's Curse (1962)
 The Four Days of Naples (1962)
 Romeo and Juliet (1964)
 Weekend, Italian Style (1965)
 Maigret a Pigalle (1966)
 The Head of the Family (1967)
 Operation St. Peter's (1967)
 The Heroin Busters (1977)

References

External links 
 

1927 births
2002 deaths
Italian film actresses